Brush High School may refer to:

Brush High School (Colorado) — Brush, Colorado
Charles F. Brush High School — Lyndhurst, Ohio
Brush Ranch School, Inc. —  Terrero, New Mexico